Celestino Bonifacio Bacale Obiang (24 September 1957 – 2 March 2021) was an Equatoguinean politician. He was the Secretary of International Relations and Cooperation of the Convergence for Social Democracy (CPDS).

Bacale was a founding member of the CPDS and was the Secretary of Information and Propaganda of the CPDS Provisional Executive Committee during the early 1990s. After copies of the CPDS paper La Verdad, which he and Plácido Micó Abogo wanted sent to Spain, were intercepted at the airport in Malabo in February 1992, Bacalé was among those arrested. When the party held its Constitutive Congress in December 1994, Bacalé became Secretary of International Relations.

Bacale was the CPDS candidate in the December 2002 presidential election; Micó Abogo, the party's leader, was imprisoned at the time. Complaining of voter fraud, Bacalé withdrew his candidacy on the day of the election. Along with Micó Abogo, he was one of two CPDS candidates elected to the Chamber of Deputies in the April 2004 parliamentary election. He and Micó Abogo won their seats from Malabo, the capital.

At the Third National Congress of the CPDS, held in Bata on 28–30 January 2005, Bacalé was re-elected to his post on CPDS National Executive Committee as Secretary for International Relations and Cooperation, however the joined the Democratic Party of Equatorial Guinea  as a member of the Executive Board 

From 2018 to 2020 Bacale served as Minister of Labor. He had previously served as Minister of Transport from 2015 to 2018 and as Minister of Trade and Commerce from 2012 till 2015.

Bacale died in Cameroon at a clinic in Douala as a result of COVID-19.

References

Members of the Chamber of Deputies (Equatorial Guinea)
Convergence for Social Democracy (Equatorial Guinea) politicians
1957 births
2021 deaths
Deaths from the COVID-19 pandemic in Cameroon